The Cincinnati Car Company or Cincinnati Car Corporation was a subsidiary of the Ohio Traction Company. It designed and constructed interurban cars, streetcars (trams) and (in smaller scale) buses. It was founded in 1902 in Cincinnati, Ohio. In 1928, it bought the Versare Car Company.

The company was among the first to make lightweight cars. Its chief engineer Thomas Elliot designed the curved-side car, a lightweight model that used curved steel plates (not conventional flat steel plates) in body construction. Instead of the floor, the side plates and side sills bore the bulk of the weight load. Longitudinal floor supports were no longer needed, which made the cars lighter than conventional cars. The first cars of this type were sold in 1922. For instance, the Red Devil weighted only . Curved-side cars were also called "Balanced Lightweight Cars".

In 1929, the company designed new lightweight partially aluminum low profile high-speed coaches for the electrified Cincinnati and Lake Erie Railroad interurban that operated between Cincinnati, Dayton, and Toledo. Twenty were purchased, painted bright red, and called Red Devils by the C&LE. These interurban cars, whose open country speed could reach , were a forerunner of today's high-speed trains. Both the carbodies and new design small wheel low ridingtrucks were well adapted for high-speed running on light rail rough track. In 1939, the C&LE abandoned operation, and the Red Devils were sold to the Cedar Rapids and Iowa City Railway (CRANDIC) in Iowa and the Lehigh Valley Transit Company in Pennsylvania. They continued to operate successfully and well into the 1950s.

Cincinnati Car Company ceased operations in 1938, but several of its original streetcars are preserved, for instance at the Saskatchewan Railway Museum, Cincinnati Museum Center at Union Terminal and the Seashore Trolley Museum.

See also
 List of tram builders

References

Further reading

Wagner, Richard 1965: Curved-Side Cars Built by Cincinnati Car Company: Railway Cars of Distinctive Lightweight Design Built in the 1920s Becoming Popularly Known as "Rubber Stamp Trolleys", Cincinnati, ASIN B00161UA7K

 
Rolling stock manufacturers of the United States
Defunct companies based in Cincinnati
Manufacturing companies based in Cincinnati
Tram manufacturers
Vehicle manufacturing companies established in 1902
1902 establishments in Ohio
Vehicle manufacturing companies disestablished in 1938
1938 disestablishments in Ohio